Le serve rivali is a dramma giocoso per musica in two acts by composer Tommaso Traetta with an Italian libretto by Pietro Chiari. The opera originally premiered in one act as an intermezzo at the Teatro San Moisè in Venice, Italy in the autumn of 1766. Traetta greatly expanded the work, and the full opera was first performed at the Fenzo Modesto in Venice later that same year.

Roles

References

1766 operas
Operas
Italian-language operas
Operas by Tommaso Traetta
Drammi giocosi